Blood Money is a 1933 American Pre-Code crime drama film directed by Rowland Brown about a crooked bail bondsman named Bill Bailey, played by George Bancroft, with Chick Chandler as crime boss Drury Darling, Judith Anderson as Drury's sister and Bailey's lover, and Frances Dee as a thrill-seeking, larcenous beauty who fatefully catches Bailey's eye. The film was considered to be lost for nearly forty years before reappearing.

This marked the film debut of Anderson (better known for her next role, housekeeper Mrs. Danvers in the 1940 Rebecca).

Cast
George Bancroft as Bill Bailey
Frances Dee as Elaine Talbart
Chick Chandler as Drury Darling
Judith Anderson as Ruby Darling
Blossom Seeley as Singer
Etienne Girardot as Bail Bond Clerk
George Regas as Charley

Dee, normally cast in wholesome roles, described Talbert in the 2002 Turner Classic Movies documentary Complicated Women as  rather weird character, to say the least. She was a kleptomaniac, a nymphomaniac, and anything in between."

Reception
New York Times critic Mordaunt Hall was unimpressed, writing, "This whimsical little tale of thievery, thuggery and attempted slaughter was mistaken for entertainment by Darryl Zanuck". He appreciated the skills of many of the actors, but thought the plot lacked logic and characterized the film overall as "flat stuff".

References

External links

1933 films
American crime drama films
American black-and-white films
1933 crime drama films
Films directed by Rowland Brown
Films produced by Darryl F. Zanuck
Films scored by Alfred Newman
Twentieth Century Pictures films
United Artists films
1930s rediscovered films
Rediscovered American films
1930s American films